MacRitchie Reservoir is Singapore's oldest reservoir.  The reservoir was completed in 1868 by impounding water with an earth embankment, and was then known as the Impounding Reservoir or Thomson Reservoir.

History

Before the early 19th century, most of the main island of Singapore was covered with primary forest. Soon after the British established a settlement in Singapore in 1819 and commercial activity took root, there was a demand for fresh water. However, it was decades before the settlement's first fresh water supply was established.

In 1927, a water treaty was signed with the Sultan of Johor and Singapore started receiving treated water from the Gunong Pulai water project Johor in 1930.

The construction of MacRitchie Reservoir brought deforestation around the area to a halt. The forest surrounding the reservoir has been protected as a water catchment reserve. The forested areas surrounding the other two reservoirs, Pierce Reservoir and Upper Seletar Reservoir (formerly Seletar Reservoir), were also protected when these reservoirs were developed.

During World War II, after the invading Japanese troops seized Bukit Timah from the defending British, the reservoir lay just beyond in their sights. Although it was successfully captured intact shortly after, the Japanese did not cut off the water supply from the reservoir, although slight damage to the reservoir's facilities like the pumping-stations meant much water was lost instead of being channelled to the city, by then crowded with almost one million British-commanded troops and refugees, which was badly in need for a steady water source. After the British surrender and the subsequent Japanese occupation of Singapore, the Imperial Japanese Army (IJA) built a Shinto shrine, Syonan Jinja, in the middle of the dense forest surrounding MacRitchie Reservoir. When the British forces re-occupied Singapore in 1945, the shrine was destroyed either by British soldiers, or by the Japanese themselves. Its ruins remain to this day but it is located in a restricted-access nature reserve and visitors are asked not to try to reach it largely due to safety reasons. The National Heritage Board declared the site a Historic Site in 2002, although no plans have been made public to develop or to protect the site.

Present
More than one square kilometre of primary forest is still standing in Central Catchment Nature Reserve today, particularly around MacRitchie Reservoir. Forest trees, remnants of the plantations from the 20th century, can still be seen along the fringes of MacRitchie Reservoir.

There are boardwalks skirting the edge of the scenic MacRitchie Reservoir and trails through the forest. They range in distances from 3 km to 11 km. Interpretative signboards along the boardwalks allow for a self-guided tour along the fringes of the MacRitchie forest.

The boardwalk around the perimeter of the MacRitchie Reservoir brings the visitor through interesting secondary forest in the Central Catchment Nature Reserve area. The boardwalk which hugs the reservoir also allows for easy exploration of freshwater wildlife. The ant plant (Macaranga bancana.) and pitcher plants are common in the area.

In addition to the boardwalk, another popular attraction is the HSBC TreeTop Walk, a 250 m aerial free-standing suspension bridge spanning Bukit Peirce and Bukit Kalang which are the two highest points in MacRitchie. The bridge was completed in July 2004, and the TreeTop Walk was officially launched on 5 November 2004. The structure, which is 25 m at its highest point, offers visitors a panoramic view of Upper Pierce Reservoir and the surrounding lush rainforest. Jelutong Tower also offers a view of the Singapore Island Country Club golf course and the MacRitchie Reservoir.

The 3.2 km and 4.8 km trails are still used as cross-country running routes for various inter-school competitions today.

Schools can be seen using the reservoir as a place for water sports such as canoeing and kayaking. There are certain competitions held there annually.

See also
Central Catchment Nature Reserve
Syonan Jinja

References

External links

National Parks Board website
 National Parks Board, Central Catchment Nature Reserve – HSBC TreeTop Walk
 360 interactive VR photo of MacRitchie Reservoir

Reservoirs in Singapore
Parks in Singapore
Tourist attractions in Singapore
Central Water Catchment